Edward J. O'Malley Jr. (born January 26, 1975) is an American non-profit executive, author, and politician.  He is the current CEO and President of the Kansas Leadership Center.

Early life
O’Malley grew up in Johnson County, Kansas. He graduated from Shawnee Mission South High School in Overland Park, KS and worked his way through college at Kansas State University, earning a Bachelors of Arts degree in history.

Public service
O’Malley began his career as an aide to Kansas Governor Bill Graves and as a staff member for the Overland Park Chamber of Commerce. He was appointed to the State House in 2003, after incumbent State Representative, Robert Tomlinson was appointed Assistant Insurance Commissioner. He was twice elected to the Kansas House of Representatives, where he represented the 24th District. In the Kansas Legislature, he served on committees for economic development, financial institutions, taxation and transportation.
 
On January 12, 2017, O'Malley announced his exploratory candidacy of Governor of Kansas in the 2018 election. O'Malley formally launched his candidacy on October 10, 2017.

In January 2007, O’Malley became the first President and CEO of the Kansas Leadership Center. The KLC is headquartered in Wichita, Kansas.

Author
 For the Common Good: Redefining Civic Leadership (co-authored with David C. Chrislip) 
 Your Leadership Edge: Lead Anytime, Anywhere (co-authored with Amanda Cebula)
 What's Right With Kansas

References

External links
Exploratory Campaign for Governor

1975 births
Living people
Kansas State University alumni
Republican Party members of the Kansas House of Representatives
21st-century American politicians